was a Japanese professional golfer.

Sugihara was born in Osaka. He won 28 tournaments and over ¥630 million on the Japan Golf Tour. He also won the 1969 Hong Kong Open.

Professional wins (60)

Japan Golf Tour wins (28)

*Note: The 1990 Bridgestone Aso Open was shortened to 54 holes due to rain.
1Co-sanctioned by the Asia Golf Circuit

Japan Golf Tour playoff record (3–6)

Asia Golf Circuit wins (2)
1969 Hong Kong Open
1975 Sobu International Open (also Japan Golf Tour)

Other wins (26)
this list is probably incomplete
1962 Japan Open
1963 Big4 Golf
1964 Chunichi Crowns, Kansai Pro Championship, Kansai Open, All Nippon Pro-Am
1965 Nippon Series, Kansai Pro Championship, Kansai Open, Kuzuha International (tie with Toichiro Toda)
1966 Kansai Best Pro
1967 Kansai Pro Championship, Kuzuha International, All Nippon Top Pro
1968 Kansai Open, Japan Pro Best 10, Setouchi Series Hiroshima leg
1970 Nippon Series, Setouchi Series Kurashiki leg, Kansai Pro Championship
1971 Kansai Open
1972 Kansai Pro Championship
1973 Nippon Series
1974 Wizard Tournament, Grand Monarch
1982 Descente Osaka Open

Senior wins (4)
1989 Japan PGA Senior Championship
1992 Japan PGA Senior Championship
1993 Kansai Pro Senior
1995 Japan PGA Senior Championship

See also
List of golfers with most Japan Golf Tour wins

References

External links

Japanese male golfers
Japan Golf Tour golfers
Japanese racehorse owners and breeders
People from Ibaraki, Osaka
Sportspeople from Osaka Prefecture
Deaths from prostate cancer
1937 births
2011 deaths